American Star may refer to:

 SS American Star, a mid-20th century ocean liner originally named the SS America
 American Star (ship), a small cruise ship launched in 2007
 American Star Bicycle, a brand
 American Star (novel), a 1993 romance novel by Jackie Collins
 "American Star", a 2010 song by Lil Wayne from the album Rebirth